was one of the administrative divisions of Korea under Japanese rule, with its capital at Kōshū. The province consisted of modern-day South Jeolla, South Korea, as well as Jeju Island.

Population

Number of people by nationality according to the 1936 census:

 Overall population: 2,416,341 people
 Japanese: 44,154 people
 Koreans: 2,370,853 people
 Other: 1,334 people

Administrative divisions

The following list is based on the administrative divisions of 1945:

Cities

Kōshū (capital)
Moppo

Counties 

Kōzan
Tan'yō
Kokujō
Kyūrei
Kōyō
Reisui
Junten
Kōkō
Hōjō
Wajun
Chōkō
Kōshin
Kainan
Reigan
Muan
Rashū
Kanpei
Reikō
Chōjō
Kantō
Chintō

Islands
Saishū Island

Provincial governors

The following people were provincial ministers before August 1919. This was then changed to the title of governor.

See also
Provinces of Korea
Governor-General of Chōsen
Administrative divisions of Korea

Korea under Japanese rule
Former prefectures of Japan in Korea